Vulgar Press is a publishing house based in Melbourne, Australia. Established in 1999, the publisher's stated aim is "the publication of working-class and other radical forms of writing". Vulgar Press publishes a number of books and magazines for alternative and non-profit companies and organisations. Their authors include Dorothy Hewett, Jeff Sparrow, Jill Sparrow, Liz Ross, Carole Ferrier and A. L. McCann.

References

External links 
 The Vulgar Press

Publishing companies established in 1999
Small press publishing companies
Book publishing companies of Australia
Companies based in Melbourne
1999 establishments in Australia